Marcin Szafrański (born 6 May 1971) is a Polish alpine skier. He competed at the 1992 Winter Olympics and the 1994 Winter Olympics.

References

1971 births
Living people
Polish male alpine skiers
Olympic alpine skiers of Poland
Alpine skiers at the 1992 Winter Olympics
Alpine skiers at the 1994 Winter Olympics
Sportspeople from Bielsko-Biała
20th-century Polish people